Alain Gottvallès (22 March 1942 – 28 February 2008) was a French swimmer, born in Casablanca, Morocco. He was world record holder in 100 metres freestyle in 1964, the first swimmer to complete the distance in less than 53 seconds.

He participated at the 1964 Summer Olympics in Tokyo, where he placed fifth in 100 metre freestyle.

See also
World record progression 100 metres freestyle

References

External links

1942 births
2008 deaths
Sportspeople from Casablanca
Pieds-Noirs
Swimmers at the 1960 Summer Olympics
Swimmers at the 1964 Summer Olympics
Olympic swimmers of France
World record setters in swimming
European Aquatics Championships medalists in swimming
French male freestyle swimmers
Swimmers at the 1963 Mediterranean Games
20th-century French people
21st-century French people